Gavin Smith (25 February 1948 – 15 September 1995) was an Australian rules footballer who played with Fitzroy in the Victorian Football League (VFL).

Notes

External links 
	

1947 births
1995 deaths
Australian rules footballers from Victoria (Australia)
Fitzroy Football Club players